Doña Ana County International Jetport  is a public-use airport located  northwest of Santa Teresa, New Mexico, United States.

It is home to War Eagles Air Museum and Red Arrow Flight Academy. It is also the home of EAA Chapter 1570, which also conducts Young Eagles Day flights. It is the home of El Paso Skydive, the only skydiving operation in West Texas and all of New Mexico.

Facilities and aircraft 
Doña Ana County International Jetport covers a large area near Santa Teresa, New Mexico. Its one runway, 10/28, is 9,550 by 100 feet (2,911 m x 30 m) and is made of asphalt.

In the 12-month period ending March 23, 2020, the airport had an average of 114 aircraft operations per day: 96% general aviation, 3% military,  and 1% air taxi. 141 aircraft were then based at this airport: 68% single-engine, 13% multi-engine, 13% jet, and 6% helicopter.

There is a single fixed-base operator (FBO) at the airport, Francis Aviation. It provides aircraft fuel, charters, and facilities to handle corporate aircraft and private charters.

The War Eagles Air Museum, an aerospace and automotive museum with exhibits including classic cars and aircraft, is also located at the airport.

Red Arrow Flight Academy 
Red Arrow Flight Academy is a flight school located at Doña Ana County International Jetport.

It offers several programs, such as Flight Training and a "Discovery Flight", and has several aircraft to rent. They have two flight simulators.

Aircraft 
Red Arrow Flight Academy owns six Cessna 172 aircraft.

Simulators 
Red Arrow Flight Academy owns two flight simulators. 

The first is a FMX Full Motion Simulator built by Redbird Flight Simulations. It is configured as a Cessna 172 with a Garmin 530 or 430 panel configuration.

The second is a FTS Simulator which comes in 20 different panel configurations for the Cessna 172, Cessna 182, Columbia 350, Cirrus SR20, and Cirrus SR22.

External links
 El Paso Skydive

References

Airports in New Mexico
Transportation in Doña Ana County, New Mexico
Museums in Doña Ana County, New Mexico